Frank Lane "Pete" Charton (born December 21, 1942) is an American former Major League Baseball pitcher.

Charton was signed  in 1963 by the Boston Red Sox as a free agent out of the Baylor University. He spent the entire  season on Boston's Major League roster to prevent him from being claimed by another team in the first-year player draft of the time. In a 25-game MLB career, Charton posted a 0–2 record with 37 strikeouts and a 5.26 ERA in 65.0 innings pitched, including five starts and 14 games finished.

After baseball, he finished college, ultimately receiving his PhD in geology from Michigan State University. He taught for a couple of years at the University of Illinois before moving on to Roane State Community College in Harriman, Tennessee, where he taught for 35 years and had an endowment scholarship named in his honor. He is also the author of the Christian devotional, "Off to College with King Solomon: A Devotional Handbook for Beginning College Students". (2012)

References

External links

Retrosheet

1942 births
Living people
Baseball players from Tennessee
Baylor Bears baseball players
Boston Red Sox players
Major League Baseball pitchers
Michigan State University alumni
People from Jackson, Tennessee
Pittsfield Red Sox players
Toronto Maple Leafs (International League) players
Winston-Salem Red Sox players